The 2017 Liga 3 West Sulawesi season is the third edition of Liga 3 West Sulawesi is a qualifying round of the 2017 Liga 3. Mamuju Utama FC are the defending champions.

Teams
This season there are 7 clubs in West Sulawesi become participants. They are: 
 Persimaju Mamuju
 PS Sandeq Polman
 Balanipa Mandar FC
 TSL AKO FC
 Gasman Majene
 PS Matra
 OTP37 FC

References 

2017 in Indonesian football
West Sulawesi